Umesh Narayan Kulkarni  (born 7 March 1942) is a former cricketer who played four Test matches for India in 1967–68 on the tour to Australia and New Zealand.

A left-arm fast-medium bowler, Kulkarni played domestic cricket in India, mostly for Bombay, from 1963–64 to 1969–70. His best figures were 4 for 43 for India against Ceylon in 1964–65. He was selected for the tour to Australia and New Zealand despite having taken only four wickets in four matches in the 1966–67 season in India. He was not successful on the tour, playing four of the eight Tests and taking five wickets. After the tour, injuries ended his playing career. He later worked for the Tata Group.

References

External links
 

1942 births
Living people
India Test cricketers
Indian cricketers
Mumbai cricketers
West Zone cricketers
People from Alibag
Cricketers from Maharashtra